The 2013–14 Slovenian Third League season began on 24 August 2013 and ended on 7 June 2014.

Clubs East

League standing

Clubs West

1 Cerknica declined promotion.

League standing

See also
2013–14 Slovenian Second League

References

External links
Football Association of Slovenia 
MNZ Lendava 
MNZ Ljubljana 

3
Slovenian Third League, 2013-14
Slovenian Third League seasons